Dominique Bertinotti (born 10 January 1954 in the 16th arrondissement of Paris) is a French politician, lecturer at the Paris Diderot University, a member of the Socialist Party and mayor of the 4th arrondissement of Paris from 2001 to 2012. On 16 May 2012, she was appointed Minister for Family in the first Ayrault Cabinet and was renewed in her role in the next government. In 2017, she joined the 1 July Movement.

See also
 2008 Paris municipal election

External links
 Official site

1954 births
Living people
French people of Italian descent
Politicians from Paris
Socialist Party (France) politicians
Women government ministers of France
Génération.s politicians